A. plicata may refer to:
 Acacia plicata, a wattle species endemic to Western Australia
 Amblema plicata, the threeridge, a freshwater mussel species

See also
 Plicata (disambiguation)